Campbell River Airport  is located  south of the city of Campbell River, British Columbia, Canada.

The airport is classified as an airport of entry by Nav Canada and is staffed by the Canada Border Services Agency. CBSA officers at this airport currently can handle general aviation aircraft only, with no more than 15 passengers.

Airlines and destinations

Vancouver Island Air provides on demand services.

See also
 List of airports on Vancouver Island

References

External links
 Official site
Campbell River Airport on COPA's Places to Fly airport directory

Certified airports in British Columbia
Campbell River, British Columbia